Renaud I is the name of:

 Renauld I, Count of Nevers (died 1040)
 Renaud I of Burgundy (986–1057)
 Renaud I of Bar (1080–1149)
 Renaud I, Count of Dammartin (1165–1227)